Escenas (Scenes) is the second studio album by Rubén Blades as a soloist and with his band Seis Del Solar, released on October 15, 1985 by Elektra Records. The album reached No. 3 on the Billboard Tropical Albums chart.

Highlighting songs like "La Cancion Del Final Del Mundo", "Caina", "Sorpresas".

Critical reception

John Storm Roberts of AllMusic noted that "there's a lot going on here" on the album, which the editors of AllMusic gave a 3.5 out of five star rating.

Escenas also won a Grammy in the category of Best Tropical Latin Performance.

Track listing

References

1985 albums
Elektra Records albums
Rubén Blades albums
Grammy Award for Best Tropical Latin Album